The following is a list of football players in NCAA Division I FBS and its predecessors ranked in the top 30 for total points scored in a career or single season. Points are calculated as 6 points for a touchdown (rushing, receiving or returning - not passing), 3 points for a field goal, 2 points for a two-point conversion (rushing or receiving), and 1 point for an extra point.

Per NCAA rules, stats from bowl games prior to 2002 are not included in these lists.

The career leaderboard is current through the 2022 regular season.

Division I FBS

References

Scoring leaders